Fransson the Terrible (Swedish: Fransson den förskräcklige) is a 1941 Swedish comedy film directed by Gösta Cederlund and starring Elof Ahrle, Carl-Gunnar Wingård, and Inga-Bodil Vetterlund. The film's sets were designed by the art director Bertil Duroj.

Synopsis
Fransson, a baker, arrives in a small town and enjoys great success with his new type of whole wheat bread, rescuing a previously struggling bakery. However malicious rumors begin to spread that he has stolen money.

Cast

 Elof Ahrle as Fransson
 Carl-Gunnar Wingård as Finholm
 Inga-Bodil Vetterlund as Barbro
 Rune Carlsten as Ågren
 Hilda Borgström as Miss Öhrström
 John Botvid as Vallin
 Einar Axelsson as Borg
 Marianne Löfgren as Rut
 Åke Engfeldt as Felix
 Emil Fjellström as Lösa Wilhelm
 Lillebil Kjellén as Britta Lund
 Yngve Nyqvist as Bakery Manager
 David Erikson as Head Clerk
 Bellan Roos as Anna
 John Elfström as Gunnar
 Elsie Albiin as Girl
 Ann-Margret Bergendahl as Kund i konditoriet
 Bengt Brunskog as Dansande ung man
 Carl Ericson as Konstapel Olofsson
 Erik Forslund as Man vid groggbordet
 Knut Frankman as Man vid groggbordet
 Mary Hjelteas Fru Lundström
 Svea Holm as Fru Karlsson
 Stig Johanson as Lindkvist
 Helge Karlsson as Policeman
 Helge Kihlberg as Herr Fred
 Wilma Malmlöf as Kund i bageriet

References

Bibliography 
 Krawc, Alfred. International Directory of Cinematographers, Set- and Costume Designers in Film: Denmark, Finland, Norway, Sweden (from the beginnings to 1984). Saur, 1986.

External links 
 

1941 films
Swedish comedy films
1941 comedy films
1940s Swedish-language films
1940s Swedish films